is a Japanese professional footballer who plays as a midfielder for NWSL club Portland Thorns and the Japan women's national team.

Club career
Sugita was born in Kitakyushu on 31 January 1997. After graduating from high school, she joined Nadeshiko League club INAC Kobe Leonessa in 2015. She debuted as midfielder in 2015. She became a regular player in 2016 and was selected Best Young player award in 2016 season.

On 26 January 2022, Sugita joined Portland Thorns based on a three-year deal.

National team career
In September 2012, when Sugita was 15 years old, she was selected for Japan's U-17 national team for 2012 U-17 Women's World Cup. She played all 4 matches and scored 2 goals. In 2013, she played at the 2013 AFC U-16 Women's Championship, which Japan won for the second time in a row. She also scored 6 goals and was selected as the tournament MVP. In 2014, she was selected for Japan's U-17 team for the 2014 U-17 Women's World Cup. She played 5 matches as captain, scoring 5 goals and leading Japan to its first championship, as well as winning the tournament's Golden Ball (MVP). In November 2016, she was selected for Japan's U-20 national team for the 2016 U-20 Women's World Cup. She played all 6 matches and Japan won the third place. She was also selected Golden Ball award.

On 2 August 2018, Sugita debuted for the Japanese national team as substitute midfielder in the 72nd minute against Australia.

Career statistics

Club

International 

Scores and results list Japan's goal tally first, score column indicates score after each Sugita goal.

Honors 
INAC Kobe Leonessa

 Empress's Cup: 2015, 2016

Portland Thorns FC

 NWSL Championship: 2022

References

External links

Japan Football Association

1997 births
Living people
Association football people from Fukuoka Prefecture
Japanese women's footballers
Japan women's international footballers
Nadeshiko League players
INAC Kobe Leonessa players
Women's association football midfielders
2019 FIFA Women's World Cup players
Footballers at the 2020 Summer Olympics
Olympic footballers of Japan
Japanese expatriate footballers
Japanese expatriate sportspeople in the United States
Expatriate women's soccer players in the United States
Portland Thorns FC players
National Women's Soccer League players